The Supreme Court of Kyrgyzstan is the highest court of appeal in the legal system of Kyrgyzstan. The Supreme Court also has supervisory powers over lower courts and, since the abolition of the Constitutional Court under the 2010 Constitution, determines the constitutionality of laws.

See also
Courts of Kyrgyzstan

External links 
Court's website

References